Gymnoscelis lophopus is a moth in the family Geometridae. It was described Turner in 1904. It is found in Queensland, Australia.

Adults have brown patterned wings.

References

Moths described in 1904
lophopus